CityLine/Bush station (formerly Bush Turnpike station) is a DART Light Rail station in Richardson, Texas. It is located on the President George Bush Turnpike near US 75 (Central Expressway). The  was added in 2010. The station is planned to be an intersection between those lines and the future Silver Line commuter rail.

In January 2016, DART announced that the station would be renamed as CityLine/Bush station on March 14 as part of the service changes, due to the enlargement of the CityLine development zone.

References

External links
 DART - Bush Turnpike Station

Dallas Area Rapid Transit light rail stations
Richardson, Texas
Railway stations in the United States opened in 2002
2002 establishments in Texas
Railway stations in Collin County, Texas
Dallas Area Rapid Transit commuter rail stations